Richard Hunt  (born 1951, Kwakwaka'wakw, formerly "Kwakiutl") is a Canadian First Nations artist from coastal British Columbia.

Hunt was born in 1951 at Alert Bay, B.C., but has lived most of his life in Victoria, B.C.  On his father's side, he is a descendant of the renowned Native ethnologist George Hunt. He began carving at the age of thirteen. In 1973 he began carving with his father Henry Hunt at Thunderbird Park at the British Columbia Provincial Museum in Victoria.

Richard's brothers Tony Hunt and Stanley C. Hunt are also carvers.

Richard Hunt designed the medals for the Pan Pacific Swimming Championships held Aug. 17-21, 2006 at Saanich Commonwealth Place.
Among his other projects, he repainted the totem pole at Rideau Hall, which his grandfather Mungo Martin had given to Governor General Lord Alexander in 1946.

Honors
In 1991, Hunt was inducted into the Order of British Columbia. He is also a member of the Order of Canada.
 
He received an honorary doctorate from the University of Victoria in 2004. He was made a member of the Royal Canadian Academy of Arts.

References 

 Hunt, Ross (2007) "The Hunt Family's Trip to West Germany to Attend the Bundesgarten Show."  Anthropology News, vol. 48, no. 2, pp. 20–21.
 Macnair, Peter L., Alan L. Hoover, and Kevin Neary (1984) The Legacy: Tradition and Innovation in Northwest Coast Indian Art.  Vancouver, B.C.: Douglas & McIntyre. , 
Art Gallery of Greater Victoria, Through My Father's Eyes: The Art of Richard Hunt, March 16, 2000 to August 27, 2000

External links
Richard Hunt Official site.
Biography of Richard Hunt,  Galleria Silecchia

1951 births
Living people
21st-century Canadian sculptors
21st-century Canadian male artists
20th-century First Nations sculptors
Canadian male sculptors
20th-century Canadian male artists
21st-century First Nations people
Artists from British Columbia
Kwakwa̱ka̱ʼwakw woodcarvers
Members of the Royal Canadian Academy of Arts
Northwest Coast art
People from Alert Bay
Totem pole carvers